The Nevada County Courthouse is located at 215 East 2nd Street in the center of Prescott, the county seat of Nevada County, Arkansas.  The Mid-Century Modern building was designed by Weaver and Hiegel, an architectural firm based in Little Rock, and was built in 1964 on the site of the previous courthouse.  The exterior is predominantly red brick, with trim and accent features of cast stone.  The main facade is symmetrical, with the entrance recessed at the center and sheltered by a tall projecting portico supported by square cast stone columns.

The building was listed on the National Register of Historic Places in 2018.

See also
National Register of Historic Places listings in Nevada County, Arkansas

References

Courthouses on the National Register of Historic Places in Arkansas
Government buildings completed in 1964
National Register of Historic Places in Nevada County, Arkansas
County courthouses in Arkansas
1964 establishments in Arkansas
Mid-century modern
Prescott, Arkansas